The 191st Massachusetts General Court was the meeting of the legislative branch of the state government of Massachusetts, composed of the Senate and the House of Representatives. It convened in Boston at the Massachusetts State House, on January 2, 2019, and ended on January 6, 2021, during the fifth and sixth years of the governorship of Charlie Baker. Senate and House districts were drawn based on the 2010 Census.

In the 2018 elections, the Democratic Party increased its majorities in both chambers, flipping two seats from the Republicans in the House and one in the Senate. Although Republican Governor Charlie Baker easily won re-election to a second term, the Democrats maintained veto-proof supermajorities in the legislature.

The session was notable for the wide-range of flash-point issues discussed; among these were climate change, police reform, the state's response to the COVID-19 pandemic, healthcare reform, and education funding. Other notable legislation included a pandemic-related vote-by-mail law. Notable bills include a proposal for a commission focused on "state agency automated decision-making, artificial intelligence, transparency, fairness, and individual rights."

Party summary

Senate

House of Representatives

Members

Senators

*Originally elected in a special election

Representatives

See also
 2018 Massachusetts general election
 2020 Massachusetts general election
 List of current Massachusetts House of Representatives committees
 COVID-19 pandemic in Massachusetts
 116th United States Congress
 List of Massachusetts General Courts

Notes

References

Further reading

External links

 End of Session Report, malegislature.gov (2019, 2020)
 (2019, 2020)
 
  (includes some video)
 

Political history of Massachusetts
Massachusetts legislative sessions
2019 U.S. legislative sessions
2019 in Massachusetts
2020 U.S. legislative sessions
2020 in Massachusetts